John Parks Newsome (February 13, 1893 – November 10, 1961) was a U.S. Representative from Alabama.

Biography
Newsome was born in Memphis, Tennessee. He spent his youth in Thompsons Station, Tennessee. He attended school there, and later attended Battle Ground Academy in nearby Franklin.

Following graduation Newsome worked in a wholesale hardware company, beginning in 1912. He became a salesman for the company the following year (1913), and remained in that capacity until leaving to serve in World War I. He received a commission as first lieutenant in the US Army on 27 November 1917, and was promoted to Infantry Captain (Fifth Division), where he served until April 29, 1919. He returned to his sales position and remained there until 1920, when he became president and treasurer of an electrical company.

World War II
After World War II broke out Newsome served as Chair of Appeals Board 2, State of Alabama Selective Service System. He was in that position in 1942–1943. He was elected on the Democratic ticket to the Seventy-eighth Congress in November 1942. He served from January 3, 1943 until January 3, 1945, having made an unsuccessful bid for re-election in November 1944.

Newsome served as president of Associated Industries of Alabama (1953–1955). He also served as a director of Exchange Security Bank, and Alabama Gas Corporation.

Newsome died in Birmingham, Alabama on November 10, 1961. He was interred in Elmwood Cemetery in that city.

References

External links
 

1893 births
1961 deaths
Politicians from Memphis, Tennessee
Military personnel from Tennessee
United States Army officers
Democratic Party members of the United States House of Representatives from Alabama
20th-century American politicians
Burials at Elmwood Cemetery (Birmingham, Alabama)